Singapore competed at the 1988 Summer Olympics in Seoul, South Korea.

Competitors
The following is the list of number of competitors in the Games.

Results by event

Shooting
 Khatijah Surattee

Swimming
Men's 50m Freestyle
 Ang Peng Siong
 Heat — 23.08
 B-Final — 23.39 (→ 11th place)

 Oon Jin Gee
 Heat — 24.86 (→ did not advance, 45th place)

Men's 100m Freestyle
 Ang Peng Siong
 Heat — 52.53 (→ did not advance, 40th place)

 Oon Jin Gee
 Heat — 53.26 (→ did not advance, 43rd place)

Men's 200m Freestyle
 David Lim
 Heat — 1:56.44(→ did not advance, 43rd place)

 Oon Jin Gee
 Heat — 1:57.28 (→ did not advance, 46th place)

Men's 400m Freestyle
 Desmond Koh
 Heat — 4:15.54 (→ did not advance, 44th place)

Men's 100m Backstroke
 David Lim
 Heat — 57.34
 B-Final — 57.72 (→ did not advance, 14th place)

Men's 200m Backstroke
 David Lim
 Heat — 2:08.65 (→ did not advance, 31st place)

Men's 100m Breaststroke
 Ng Yue Meng
 Heat — 1:05.87 (→ did not advance, 41st place)

Men's 200m Breaststroke
 Ng Yue Meng
 Heat — 2:30.74 (→ did not advance, 47th place)

Men's 100m Butterfly
 Ang Peng Siong
 Heat — 57.41 (→ did not advance, 35th place)

Men's 200m Butterfly
 Desmond Koh
 Heat — 2:10.86 (→ did not advance, 37th place)

Men's 200m Individual Medley
 David Lim
 Heat — 2:11.57 (→ did not advance, 34th place)

 Desmond Koh
 Heat — 2:14.77 (→ did not advance, 41st place)

Men's 4 × 100 m Freestyle Relay
 Ang Peng Siong, David Lim, Oon Jin Gee, and Desmond Koh
 Heat — 3:34.54 (→ did not advance, 15th place)

Men's 4 × 100 m Medley Relay
 David Lim, Ng Yue Meng, Ang Peng Siong, and Oon Jin Gee
 Heat — 3:52.86 (→ did not advance, 17th place)

Sailing
 Chan Joseph
 Siew Shaw Her

References

Official Olympic Reports

Nations at the 1988 Summer Olympics
1988
1988 in Singaporean sport